The Circle of Death (German: Der Todesreigen) is a 1922 German silent drama film directed by William Karfiol and starring Johannes Riemann, Olga Tschechowa and Albert Steinrück.

The film's sets were designed by the art director Siegfried Wroblewsky.

Cast
 Johannes Riemann as Leonid Lowitsch Rumin 
 Olga Tschechowa as Olga Petrowna 
 Albert Steinrück as Lebedow, Reitknecht 
 Hans Adalbert Schlettow as Konstantin Chrenow 
 Fritz Kampers as Leo Maximow 
 Rudolf Del Zopp
 Lilly Eisenlohr
 Olga Engl
 Ida Fane
 Maria Forescu
 Eduard Koffler
 Robert Leffler
 Clementine Plessner
 Paul Rehkopf
 Robert C. Rohde
 Hedwig Schröder
 Sylvia Torf

References

Bibliography
 Grange, William. Cultural Chronicle of the Weimar Republic. Scarecrow Press, 2008.

External links

1922 films
Films of the Weimar Republic
Films directed by William Karfiol
German silent feature films
German black-and-white films
1922 drama films
German drama films
Russian Revolution films
Silent drama films
1920s German films
1920s German-language films